Out-of-school learning is an educational concept first proposed by Lauren Resnick in her 1987 AERA presidential address, which consists of curricular and non-curricular learning experiences for pupils and students outside the school environment.

Goals
The point of out-of-school learning is to overcome learning disabilities, development of talents, strengthen communities and increase interest in education by creating extra learning opportunities in the real world. In a study performed by the UCLA National Center for Research on Evaluation, Standards, and Student Testing (CRESST) it was proven that out-of-school learning increases the interest in education and school itself.

Implementation
Out-of-school learning is typically not coordinated by the school itself. Out-of-school experiences are organized with community partners such as museums, sport facilities, charity initiatives, and more. Out-of-school experiences can range from service learning to summer school and expeditions or more commonly occur in day to day experiences at after-school with creative ventures such as arts courses and even sports. Some other examples of out-of-school learning are:

 homework and homework clubs
 study clubs – extending curriculum
 mentoring – by other pupils and by adults, including parents
 learning about learning
 community service and citizenship
 residential activities – study weeks or weekends

Results
It has been found in research by the Wallace Foundation that out-of-school learning can be a great opportunity to discover and develop talents. Especially if a professional organization develops a learning environment that guides groups of pupils/students in their co-operation in creating a professional and publicly visible product, presentation or performance. Companies, cultural institutions and non governmental organizations can offer valuable out-of-school learning experiences.

Organizations will see results accordingly to the quality of the experience, whether they aim to promote active and healthy lifestyles, increase community involvement and visitors/members, to an interest in a company's corporate responsibility projects and employment opportunities.

Projects

In the United Kingdom alone, several local and state bodies run out-of-school learning projects, with additional funding from the National Lottery (£9.1m in 2000). Some major examples of out-of-school learning projects are:
 Parentzone, an out of school learning initiative from the Scottish government
 LA's Best, an out of school learning initiative from Tom Bradley mayor of  Los Angeles, California from 1973 to 1993
 Sarahs'wereld and De Wenswijk, out of school learning initiatives from the Wensenwerk Foundation sponsored by the Ministry of Housing, Spatial Planning and the Environment in the Netherlands.

See also

Constructivism
Cooperative education

References

External links
Nonprofit Research Collection on Learning After School Published on IssueLab

Community building
Applied learning
Alternative education